Heteroclinus eckloniae, the Kelp weedfish, is a species of clinid native to the Indo-Pacific waters of the western and southern coasts of Australia where it can be found in kelp and algal reefs.  This species can reach a maximum length of  TL.

References

eckloniae
Fish described in 1970